is a Japanese politician of the Liberal Democratic Party, a member of the House of Representatives in the Diet (national legislature). A native of Osaka, Osaka and graduate of Kansai University, he was elected to the House of Representatives for the first time in 2005.

References 
 

1960 births
Living people
People from Osaka
Politicians from Fukui Prefecture
Koizumi Children
Members of the House of Representatives (Japan)
Liberal Democratic Party (Japan) politicians